Three ships in the United States Navy have been named USS Dahlgren for John A. Dahlgren.

 , was a torpedo boat, commissioned in 1900 and decommissioned in 1919.
 , was a  commissioned in 1920, served in World War II and decommissioned in 1945.
 , was a  guided missile destroyer, commissioned in 1961 and decommissioned in 1992.

United States Navy ship names